Coenraet Decker (1650 in Amsterdam – 1685 in Amsterdam), was a Dutch Golden Age engraver.

According to the RKD he had been a pupil of Romeyn de Hooghe and married Aechje Jans in 1673 in Sloterdijk when he was 23. In the 1670s, he worked on the map of Delft contract that he won together with Dirk van Bleiswijk, for their work on Bleiswijk's Description of Delft (Dutch: Beschryvinge der stad Delft).

References

External links
Vermeer and The Delft School, a full text exhibition catalog from The Metropolitan Museum of Art, which has material on Coenraet Decker

1650 births
1685 deaths
Dutch Golden Age printmakers
Artists from Amsterdam